The Multiple Myeloma Research Foundation (MMRF) is a charitable organization dedicated to multiple myeloma, an incurable blood cancer. The MMRF runs as if it were a for-profit business, expecting high returns from the money the organization raises from donors.

History
MMRF was founded in 1998 by twin sisters Kathy Giusti and Karen Andrews, following Kathy's diagnosis with multiple myeloma. Giusti, a pharmaceutical company executive and Harvard Business School Alum, wanted to encourage researchers to develop treatments for multiple myeloma by using business models rather than academic models of drug development.

About The MMRF
MMRF is a private funder of multiple myeloma research, having raised over $120 million since its inception to contribute funding to more than 120 laboratories worldwide.  MMRF funding contributes to diverse research strategies to yield long-, mid-, and short-term results in an effort to deliver better treatments to patients faster: basic science programs to better understand the disease and identify new druggable targets through genomics and proteomics research; validation programs to prioritize new compounds and combinations based on key targets; and clinical trials conducted at a number of myeloma centers.

In 2009, the MMRF funded research into 30 compounds at the pre-clinical stage. By 2013 it had raised more than $250 million and its work has helped gain approval of six new drugs to treat the disease.

See also
 Multiple Myeloma Research Consortium

Notes

External links
 Multiple Myeloma Research Foundation

Biomedical research foundations
Cancer charities in the United States
Charities based in Connecticut
Immune system disorders
Norwalk, Connecticut
1998 establishments in the United States
Organizations established in 1998
Medical and health organizations based in Connecticut